Thomas Dam (May 15, 1915-November 12, 1989) was a Danish woodworker and fisherman associated with Gjøl in Denmark. Dam designed and invented the original troll doll also known  as the "Good Luck Troll". He created the toy during a period of financial distress, and carved it from wood. Soon, the family had started up a new business and Dam earned enough to buy himself a small factory where the dolls were produced in plastic. Dam created many different trolls as well as plastic baby dolls. Dam formed "Dam Things" to market the dolls. Dam trolls are now considered collectors' items. The Victoria and Albert Museum of London have one in their collection.

Legacy
In 2016 and 2020, DreamWorks Animation released two animated films based on the dolls: Trolls and Trolls World Tour, with music by Christophe Beck and featuring (amongst many others) the voices of Anna Kendrick and Justin Timberlake (who also acted as executive music producer).

References

External links
Danish website dedicated to Dam and trolls
 https://www.smithsonianmag.com/innovation/colorful-history-troll-doll-180974634/

 
20th-century Danish woodworkers
Danish designers
1915 births
1989 deaths
Toy designers
Danish woodworkers